The South Australian Railways 500 class was a class of 4-8-2 steam locomotives operated by the South Australian Railways. They were rebuilt as 4-8-4s.

History
The 500 class were part of larger order for 30 steam locomotives placed with Armstrong Whitworth, England, in 1924, as part of the rehabilitation of the state's rail system being overseen by Railways Commissioner William Webb. They replaced the Rx and S class locomotives, many dating back to 1894, that were still performing mainline duties, meaning that double and even triple heading was common. All ten 500-class locomotives arrived in Adelaide in 1926, and entered service on the Adelaide to Wolseley line as far as Tailem Bend. All were named after notable South Australians.

Rebuilding
In May 1928, 506 was experimentally fitted with a booster, included in a newly created four wheel trailing truck. This modification was subsequently fitted to the nine remaining locomotives, resulting in the class becoming the 4-8-4 class 500B.

Throughout the mid-1930s all but two of the locomotives in the class were semi-streamlined and had valances fitted. The first two 500-class locomotives were withdrawn from service in 1955 and the last was withdrawn in 1962.

504 is preserved as a static exhibit at the National Railway Museum, Port Adelaide.

Class list

References

Further reading

Armstrong Whitworth locomotives
Railway locomotives introduced in 1926
500
4-8-2 locomotives
4-8-4 locomotives
Broad gauge locomotives in Australia